Lake Darling Dam is an earthen embankment dam on the Souris River in the  west north central United States, located  northwest of Minot in Ward County, North Dakota. The dam began impounding water in April 1936 and was completed July of that year; it was created for the purposes of water storage and conservation.

It is part of the Upper Souris National Wildlife Refuge and is owned by the United States Fish and Wildlife Service. The dam and lake are named after Jay N. "Ding" Darling, the first director of the Bureau of Biological Survey. Although the dam is located in Ward County, Lake Darling is almost entirely located in Renville County, to its north.

The Fish and Wildlife Service owns and operates the dam during normal conditions. During flood conditions operational control is turned over to the U.S. Army Corps of Engineers according to a 1989 memorandum of understanding. By June 26, releases had reached  and were incrementally reduced thereafter.

See also
Rafferty Dam
Grant Devine Dam

References

Dams in North Dakota
Earth-filled dams
Dams completed in 1936
Buildings and structures in Ward County, North Dakota
United States Army Corps of Engineers dams
Bodies of water of Renville County, North Dakota
Darling
Souris River